is a Japanese actor, voice actor and narrator from Suginami, Tokyo. His younger brother was Kazumi Tanaka. He is currently affiliated with Aoni Production.

He is most known for the roles of Akira Fudo/Devilman (Devilman), Nobita's teacher (Doraemon), and Cancer Deathmask (Saint Seiya).

Filmography

Television animation
Tiger Mask (1970) (Kentaro Takaoka/Yellow Devil)
Akakichi no Eleven (1970) (Shingo Tamai)
Devilman (1972) (Akira Fudo/Devilman)
Cutie Honey (1973) (Johnny) (episode 19)
Dokaben (1976) (Fumio Ataru, Ohkawa)
UFO Robo Grendizer (1977) (Zuril Junior)
Doraemon (1979) (Sensei)
Fang of the Sun Dougram (1981) (Rocky Andor)
Kinnikuman (1983) (Warsman (First), Jesse Maivia, Mister Khamen)
Lightspeed Electroid Albegas (1983) (Kurohara)
Nine 2: Sweetheart Declaration (1983) (Morio)
Ginga: Nagareboshi Gin (1986) (Kurotora, Hakuro)
Saint Seiya (1986) (Cancer Deathmask, Musca Dio)
Transformers: The Headmasters (1987) (Brainstorm)
Hokuto no Ken 2 (1987) (Jo)
Transformers: Super-God Masterforce (1988) (Lander)
Kiteretsu Daihyakka (1988) (Shintaro)
Himitsu no Akko-chan (1988) (Tetsu)
Sakigake!! Otokojuku (1988) (Rankiryuu (Hikoubou))
Transformers: Victory (1989) (Blue Bacchus)
Chibi Maruko-chan (1990) (Headmaster)
Kinnikuman: Scramble for the Throne (1991) (Prisman)
Aoki Densetsu Shoot! (1993) (Ohmmori)
Kochira Katsushika-ku Kameari Koen-mae Hashutsujo (1996) (Daidiro Ohara)
One Piece (1999) (Moore, Minister of the Left)
Vandread (2000) (Prime Minister)
Koi Kaze (2004) (Zenzo Saeki)
Saint Seiya: Soul of Gold (2015) (Cancer Deathmask)
Tiger Mask W (2016) (Kentaro Takaoka)
Hanma Baki - Son of Ogre (2021) (Prison Warden)

Original video animation
Legend of the Galactic Heroes (1989) (Hans Eduard Bergengrun)
Kamen Rider SD (1993) (Kamen Rider V3)

Theatrical animation
Do It! Yasuji's Pornorama (1971)
Mazinger Z vs. Devilman (1973) (Akira Fudo/Devilman)
Mazinger Z vs. The Great General of Darkness (1974) (Tetsuya Tsurugi)
Dougram (1983) (Rocky)
Doraemon: Nobita's Great Adventure into the Underworld (1984) (Sensei)
The Dagger of Kamui (1985) (Jackal)
Doraemon: Nobita and the Steel Troops (1986) (Sensei)
Dragon Ball: Sleeping Princess in Devil's Castle (1987) (Demon)
Doraemon: The Record of Nobita's Parallel Visit to the West (1988) (Sensei)
Doraemon: Nobita and the Birth of Japan (1989) (Sensei)
Doraemon: Nobita and the Animal Planet (1990) (Doctor)
Doraemon: Nobita's Dorabian Nights (1991) (Merchant)
Doraemon: Nobita and the Kingdom of Clouds (1992) (Sensei)
Doraemon: Nobita and the Tin Labyrinth (1993) (Sensei)
Doraemon: Nobita's Three Visionary Swordsmen (1994) (Sensei)
2112: The Birth of Doraemon (1995) (Mr. Robot)
Doraemon: Nobita's Diary of the Creation of the World (1995) (Sensei)
Doraemon: Nobita and the Galaxy Super-express (1996) (Curator)
Doraemon: Nobita's the Night Before a Wedding (1999) (Sensei)
Doraemon: Nobita Drifts in the Universe (1999) (Sensei)
Doraemon: Nobita and the Legend of the Sun King (2000) (Sensei)
Dragon Ball Z: Battle of Gods (2013) (Old Kaioushin)
Dragon Ball Z: Resurrection 'F' (2015) (Dr. Briefs)

Tokusatsu
Ike! Greenman (1973) (Demon Lord)
Ike! Ushiwaka Kotarou (1974) (Kotaro Ushikawa)
Ultraman Tiga (1996) (Gobunyu (Vaha) (ep. 19))
Mirai Sentai Timeranger (2000) (Counselor Zektar (ep. 31))
Hyakuju Sentai Gaoranger (2001) (Shrine Bell Org (ep. 4))
Kamen Rider Agito (2001) (Crab Lord/Crustata Palleo (ep. 30 - 31))
Ninpuu Sentai Hurricanger (2002) (Nightmare Ninja Yumebakushi (ep. 10))
Tokusou Sentai Dekaranger (2004) (Tenkaolien Raja Namunan (ep. 35))

Video games
Summon Night 2 (2001) (Frip)
Mega Man X: Command Mission (2003) (Colonel Redips)
Dragon Ball Z: Tenkaichi 2 (2006) (Ghost)
Kinnikuman Muscle Grand Prix MAX (2006) (Mister Khamen)
Kinnikuman Muscle Grand Prix 2 (2008) (Mister Khamen)
Dragon Ball Z: Ultimate Tenkaichi (2011) (Old Supreme Kai)
Saint Seiya: Brave Soldiers (2013) (Cancer Deathmask)

Dubbing

Live-action
Aliens (1989 TV Asashi edition) (Private William Hudson (Bill Paxton))
An Officer and a Gentleman (Della Serra(Tony Plana))
Chances Are (Richard (Marc McClure))
Commando (1989 TV Asashi edition) (Sully (David Patrick Kelly))
Crimson Tide (2000 TV Asashi edition) (Chief of the Boat Cobb (George Dzundza))
JFK (1994 TV Asashi edition) (Lee Harvey Oswald (Gary Oldman))
The Monuments Men (Pvt. Preston Savitz (Bob Balaban))
National Lampoon's Animal House (1983 TV Asashi edition) (Lawrence "Pinto" Kroger (Tom Hulce))
An Officer and a Gentleman (1986 Fuji TV edition) (Emiliano Della Serra (Tony Plana))
The Omega Man (Richie (Eric Laneuville))
Platoon (1989 TV Asahi edition) (Francis (Corey Glover))
Red Heat (Salim (J.W. Smith))
Taps (Cadet Major Brian Moreland (Timothy Hutton))
Time Bandits (Vermin (Tiny Ross))
Total Recall (Benny (Mel Johnson Jr.))

Animated
G.I. Joe: A Real American Hero (Cobra Commander)
SWAT Kats: The Radical Squadron (Jake Clawson/Razor)
Thomas and Friends (Season 1–7) (Duncan/Bulstrode/Byron/The Vicar (Season 3 only)/Cyril/additional voices)
The Transformers (Cobra Commander)
PB&J Otter (Mayor Jeff)
Peanuts (Schroder)
Babar (Zephir)

Japanese Voice-Over
Peter Pan's Flight (Pirates Gordon)

References

External links
 Ryōichi Tanaka at GamePlaza-Haruka Voice Acting Database 
 Ryōichi Tanaka at Hitoshi Doi's Seiyuu Database 
 
 
 

1947 births
Living people
People from Suginami
Male voice actors from Tokyo
Japanese male video game actors
Japanese male voice actors
Tama Art University alumni
Aoni Production voice actors